Stephen "Steve" Owens (born July 4, 1965)  is an American college baseball coach, currently serving as head coach of the Rutgers Scarlet Knights baseball team. He has held that position since prior to the 2020 season.

Owens played football and baseball at St. Lawrence and was drafted in the 25th round of the 1987 MLB Draft.  He played two seasons in the Chicago Cubs organization, reaching Class A.  He then turned to coaching, serving as an assistant baseball and football coach at Ithaca Bombers. The following season, he earned a head coaching position with the Cortland Red Dragons baseball team, where he remained for eight seasons. He then coached at Le Moyne before becoming head coach at Bryant. In 2013, he led the Bulldogs to the NCAA Tournament and was recognized as the ABCA Northeast Region Coach of the Year.

Owens has won nine conference Coach of the Year Awards.  At Cortland, he was named SUNYAC Coach of the Year in 1993, 1994, 1995, and 1998; at Le Moyne, MAAC Coach of the Year in 2004 and 2006; and at Bryant, NEC Coach of the Year in 2012, 2013, and 2014.

Coaching career

Rutgers
On June 26, 2019, Steve Owens was announced as the new head coach of the Rutgers baseball program, replacing Joe Litterio whose contract was not renewed.

Head coaching record
This table depicts Owens' record as an NCAA head coach.

See also
List of current NCAA Division I baseball coaches

References

External links

Living people
1965 births
Bryant Bulldogs baseball coaches
Charleston Wheelers players
Cortland Red Dragons baseball coaches
Geneva Cubs players
Ithaca Bombers baseball coaches
Ithaca Bombers football coaches
Ithaca College alumni
Le Moyne Dolphins baseball coaches
People from Sauquoit, New York
Rutgers Scarlet Knights baseball coaches
St. Lawrence Saints baseball players
St. Lawrence Saints football players